Derek Bouchard-Hall (born July 16, 1970) is a former US professional cyclist, whose career highlights include winning the gold medal in the team pursuit at the 1999 Pan American Games, winning the 2000 United States National Criterium Championships, and competing on the 2000 US Olympic team in Sydney, Australia.   Since 2018, he has been the CEO of Assos of Switzerland.

Early life 

Derek Albert Bouchard-Hall was born at the naval base in Port Hueneme, CA, where his naval officer father was based. He spent most of his childhood in Norton, MA, where he graduated as valedictorian from Norton High School in 1988.  Though a successful runner in high school, a foot injury led Bouchard-Hall to pursue cycling at Princeton University.  Bouchard-Hall graduated from Princeton in 1992, with a degree in Architectural Engineering, then moved to the West Coast to attend Stanford University.

Bouchard-Hall graduated from Stanford in 1994 with an MS in Structural Engineering and began his professional cycling career, signing with Team Shaklee. Shaklee teammates introduced Bouchard-Hall to track cycling, and he soon began to train with the US track cycling team.  From 1996–2000, Bouchard-Hall divided his cycling calendar into training and competing for both his professional road cycling team and for the US National track cycling team.

Career 

In 1998, Bouchard-Hall moved from Team Shaklee to the newly formed Mercury Cycling Team, where he competed both domestically and internationally. It was as a member of the Mercury team where Bouchard-Hall achieved his greatest road successes, winning the United States National Criterium Championships in 2000 and competing in Paris–Roubaix, Gent–Wevelgem, and Critérium International.

In 1999, Bouchard-Hall was a member of the gold medal winning team pursuit squad at the Pan American Games in Winnipeg, Canada.
In 2000, Bouchard-Hall achieved another career highlight when he was selected as a member of the US Olympic team, to compete in the track cycling team pursuit event, after winning the US National Championship in the team pursuit with Erin Hartwell, Mariano Friedick, and Tommy Mulkey.  At the 2000 Sydney Olympics, Bouchard-Hall and the US team pursuit team finished in 10th place.
Bouchard-Hall continued to cycle for Mercury until the 2002 cycling season, when he announced his retirement at the age of 32 during the US Road Championships in Philadelphia, PA., in June.  At the time, Mercury was ranked #1 in the NRC team standings.

Exterior and Common Iliac Endofibrosis

Toward the end of his cycling career, Bouchard-Hall began experiencing pain and loss of strength in his left leg when he was training.  After months of various medical and physio examinations, and through his own extensive research, he sought the advice of a vascular surgeon at the Mayo Clinic in Rochester, MN.  Bouchard-Hall underwent surgery at Stanford University Medical Center to correct the problem in the winter of 2000, which ultimately led to his most successful year as a professional cyclist.  In 2002, however, the pain and numbness in his leg returned, and, rather than risking a second highly invasive surgery, he retired.

Post-cycling career 

From 2002–2004, Bouchard-Hall attended Harvard Business School, graduating with an MBA in 2004, and began working in management consulting, first in Boston and then, in 2006, for McKinsey and Company in London. In 2009–2010, he served as interim director of the US Small Business Administration's HUBZone program, in Washington, DC, before returning to London in the summer of 2010.  In October 2011, Bouchard-Hall has been an executive with Wiggle Ltd, one of the world's largest internet retailers of cycling, running, and triathlon equipment. Bouchard-Hall succeeded Steve Johnson as President and CEO of USA Cycling in June 2015, which he departed in 2018 to become the CEO of Assos of Switzerland.

Personal 

Bouchard-Hall is married with two children and resides in Ticino, Switzerland.

Results 

Professional Cycling Resume

1994
 1st in Prologue Tour de Toona, United States of America

1995
 3rd in National Championship, Track, Points race, Elite, United States of America, USA
 2nd in National Championship, Track, Elimination, Elite, United States of America, USA
 2nd in National Championship, Track, Scratch, Elite, United States of America, USA

1996
 1st in Prologue Norman, United States of America
 1st in Stage 3 Wichita Falls Race, United States of America
 5th in National Championship, Road, Criterium, Elite, United States of America, Downers Grove (Illinois), USA

1997
 1st in Prologue Stage Race Norman, USA
 1st in Stage 2 Merced, USA
 3rd in Stage 1 Redlands Bicycle Classic, Highland (California), USA

1998
 1st in Los Gatos, USA
 2nd in Prologue Redlands Bicycle Classic, Highland (California), USA
 3rd in Stage 1 Redlands Bicycle Classic, Highland (California), USA

1999
 3rd in Downers Grove, USA
 1st in Stage 4 Fitchburg Longsjo Classic, USA
 1st in Merced, USA
 1st in Prologue Tour of Willamette, USA
 2nd in Stage 2 Merced, USA
 1st in Pescadero, USA
 2nd in National Championship, Road, Criterium, Elite, United States of America, Downers Grove (Illinois), USA
 3rd in Stage 6 Trans Canada, Canada

2000
 1st in Downers Grove, USA
 2nd in Natchez, USA
 1st in National Championship, Track, Team Pursuit, Elite, United States of America, USA (w/Erin Hartwell, Mariano Friedick, Tommy Mulkey)
 1st in Santa Rosa, Criterium, USA
 3rd in Milton, USA
 1st in Pescadero, United States of America
 2nd in Stage 4 Cascade Classic, Bend (Oregon), USA
 3rd in Stage 6 Cascade Classic, Bend (Oregon), USA
 2nd in Stage 1 Tour de Toona, USA
 3rd in Stage 3 Tour de Toona, Hollidaysburg (Pennsylvania), USA
 1st in National Championship, Road, Criterium, Elite, United States of America, Downers Grove (Illinois), USA

2001
 1st in Extran Challenge, USA
 1st in Stage 1 Valley of the Sun Stage Race, USA
 2nd in Snelling, USA
 1st in Tour of the Hilltowns, USA
 1st in Attleboro, USA
 1st in Stage 5 Wendy's International Cycling Classic, USA
 2nd in General Classification Wendy's International Cycling Classic, USA
 1st in Concord, USA
 1st in Bow, USA
 2nd in National Championship, Road, Criterium, Elite, United States of America, USA

2002
 1st in Cantua Creek, USA
 3rd in Dinuba, Criterium, USA

References 

1970 births
Living people
Cyclists at the 2000 Summer Olympics
Olympic cyclists of the United States
American male cyclists
Harvard Business School alumni
Pan American Games medalists in cycling
Pan American Games gold medalists for the United States
Stanford University School of Engineering alumni
Princeton University School of Architecture alumni
American track cyclists
Cyclists at the 1999 Pan American Games
Medalists at the 1999 Pan American Games